Khalid Shahdan  is a former Malaysian footballer and a current coach. He was often called the "Malaysia zico" by fans.

Career
Khalid spent his footballing career in Johor, mainly with Johor FA, where he won two Malaysia Cup in 1985 and 1991 and Semi-Pro Division 1 championship in 1991. Towards the end of his footballing career, he played with Johor FC and won FAM Cup in 1995.

After retiring as player, Khalid moved into coaching, and earned coaching diploma from Football Association of Malaysia and Asian Football Confederation. He worked as coach in Johor FA in various age groups, and was the head coach of Johor in Malaysia Super League from 2004 to 2006.  After he coached the Johor Malays team to win the King's Gold Cup championship in 2007, FA of Malaysia then employed Khalid as head coach for their youth teams.

National team
An international for Malaysia in the 1980s, Khalid won the 1986 Merdeka Tournament. He also won silver medal for Malaysia in the 1987 Southeast Asian Games.

Honours

Player
Johor FA
Malaysia Super League / Division 1: 1991; runner-up 1985
Malaysia Cup: 1985, 1991; runner-up 1986
Malaysia Charity Shield: 1986; runner-up: 1992
 Sultan Hassanal Bolkiah Cup: 1987

Johor FC
Malaysia FAM League: 1995; runner-up 1996

Malaysia
Merdeka Cup: 1986
Southeast Asian Games Silver Medal: 1987

Manager
Johor Malay
King's Gold Cup: 2007

References

Malaysian footballers
Malaysia international footballers
Johor Darul Ta'zim F.C. players
Living people
1964 births
People from Johor
Southeast Asian Games silver medalists for Malaysia
Southeast Asian Games medalists in football
Association football midfielders
Competitors at the 1987 Southeast Asian Games